Mays Chapel is an unincorporated community and census-designated place in Baltimore County, Maryland, United States. The population was 11,420 at the 2010 census.

History
Mays Chapel Village was developed in the 1970s. The property was originally a large farm known as Mayfair, whose 1812 stone house remains overlooking Greenpoint Road near its intersection with Avebury Road. The land originally belonged to Thomas Cockey Deye, and it was the home of Frederick Price and Penelope Deye Owings Price. Penelope Price was later remarried, taking the surname Goodwin.  The 1850 Baltimore County Atlas confirms Mrs. Goodwin's residency in the dwelling.  Upon her death in 1875, the property passed to her heirs, first to Eliza Goodwin and then Charles E.R. Goodwin.  In 1904, the property finally passed out of the family upon its conveyance to Fairfax S. Landstreet from then-owner Edward G. Cherbonnier. The original road leading from York Road was called Landstreet Road, and while this is now cut off by Interstate 83, the lot on which the 1812 house stands is still listed as being on Landstreet Road. The farmland was sold for development in the 1970s, and Mays Chapel Village was named for a nearby mid-19th century church.

Geography
Mays Chapel is located at  (39.433708, −76.649694), to the west of Timonium across Interstate 83.

Demographics

As of the census of 2000, there were 11,427 people, 4,675 households, and 3,225 families residing in the CDP. The racial makeup of the CDP was 90.85% White, 0.86% African American, 0.04% Native American, 6.96% Asian, 0.01% Pacific Islander, 0.40% from other races, and 0.88% from two or more races. Hispanic or Latino of any race were 1.32% of the population.

There were 4,675 households, out of which 32.2% had children under the age of 18 living with them, 59.5% were married couples living together, 7.4% had a female householder with no husband present, and 31.0% were non-families. 26.4% of all households were made up of individuals, and 9.2% had someone living alone who was 65 years of age or older. The average household size was 2.44 and the average family size was 2.99.

In the CDP, the population was spread out, with 25.2% under the age of 18, 3.8% from 18 to 24, 27.8% from 25 to 44, 28.3% from 45 to 64, and 15.0% who were 65 years of age or older. The median age was 42 years. For every 100 females, there were 86.5 males. For every 100 females age 18 and over, there were 83.1 males.

The median income for a household in the CDP was $71,786, and the median income for a family was $84,549. Males had a median income of $61,841 versus $45,036 for females. The per capita income for the CDP was $41,086. About 2.0% of families and 2.4% of the population were below the poverty line, including 1.8% of those under age 18 and 3.4% of those age 65 or over.

References

External links

Census-designated places in Baltimore County, Maryland
Census-designated places in Maryland